Yamaç is a village in the Söke district, Aydın Province, Turkey. As of 2010 it had a population of 126 people.

References

Villages in Söke District